Marxist–Leninist League is the name of more than one group:

 Marxist-Leninist League (Denmark)
 Marxist-Leninist League (Norway)
 Marxist-Leninist League of Tigray
 Marxist–Leninist League of Colombia

Political party disambiguation pages